Kanerva is a Finnish surname. Notable people with the surname include:

Emma Kanerva (born 1985), Finnish dressage rider
Ilkka Kanerva (1948–2022), Finnish politician
Janne Kanerva (born 1970), Finnish weightlifter
Markku Kanerva (born 1964), Finnish football manager and former player
Pentti Kanerva, American neuroscientist
Silja Kanerva (born 1985), Finnish sailor 
William Kanerva (1902–1956), Finnish football player

See also
 Kanervo

Finnish-language surnames